Bo Erik Örjan Forssander (born 2 August 1942) is a retired Swedish sprinter. He competed at the 1964, 1968 and 1972 Olympics in the 110 m hurdles with the best achievement of sixth place in 1968. He won a silver medal in this event at the 1970 European Cup and finished eighth at the 1966 European Championships. Forssander was the Swedish champion over 100 m (1967) and 110 m hurdles (1960, 1961, 1963–64 and 1967–72), and held the national record in the 110 m hurdles from 1964 to 1992.

References

1942 births
Living people
Swedish male hurdlers
Olympic athletes of Sweden
Athletes (track and field) at the 1964 Summer Olympics
Athletes (track and field) at the 1968 Summer Olympics
Athletes (track and field) at the 1972 Summer Olympics